Lepidochrysops kennethi is a butterfly in the family Lycaenidae. It is found in Tanzania (the Iringa District). The habitat consists of montane grassland with stunted deciduous trees at altitudes between 1,800 and 2,000 meters.

Adults are on wing from late December to early January.

References

Butterflies described in 1986
Lepidochrysops
Endemic fauna of Tanzania
Butterflies of Africa